Lord Holland may refer any of the holders of the following titles:
 Earl of Holland, created in the Peerage of England in 1624, became extinct in 1759
 Baron Holland
 Baron Holland of Holland in the County of Lincoln, created in the Peerage of England in 1762, became extinct in 1859
 Baron Holland of Foxley in the County of Wiltshire, created in the Peerage of England in 1763, became extinct in 1859